Sigurd Hjorth Müller (21 December 1844 – 2 December 1918) was a Danish educator and writer.

He was born in Snedsted. Following his education, he was a teacher, worked for Dagbladet and Morgenbladet, and was a headmaster in Kolding from 1886 to 1901.

He was also a translator, public lecturer, poet, textbook writer, encyclopedic contributor, literary historian and art critic. He was the father of Paul Læssøe Müller.

References

1844 births
1918 deaths
People from Thisted
Danish educators
Danish literary historians
Danish art historians
Danish art critics
19th-century Danish poets
18th-century Danish translators
Textbook writers